The Adventure Girls was a three-book series written by Clair Blank, author of the Beverly Gray stories. A trilogy by default, The Adventure Girls series was published by A. L. Burt in 1936 and never continued. All works were copyrighted on April 27, 1936, the same day as Beverly Gray on a World Cruise. Although a fourth work was advertised at the end of the third, it was never published; where the Beverly Gray series survived and prospered following the publication of its four part "breeder set," The Adventure Girls series was unable to catch on. Purchased by Saalfield in 1937, the series was entirely shelved until being reissued in the fall of 1942. None of the books had their copyright renewed, and all have thus passed into the public domain.

Structurally and stylistically, The Adventure Girls books are extremely similar to the Beverly Gray series for which Blank is better known. Each series follows a large cast of central characters through numerous adventures, flowing uninterrupted from one to the next; the Beverly Gray series was termed a "soap opera," an equally applicable designation for The Adventure Girls books. By the third book The Adventure Girls became the college mystery series that started off the Beverly Gray works, and even though cancelled before the fourth volume was published, the similarities in intended plot are clear: in The Adventure Girls on Vacation the protagonists were set to begin a cruise on a yacht owned by a wealthy friend, the precise theme of the contemporaneous Beverly Gray books.

Clair Blank

Books 

* Errantly referred to as "K-Bar-O" on the dust jacket

† Advertised by name at the end of the third book, but never published

The Adventure Girls at K Bar O 

The Adventure Girls at K Bar O introduces the six titular heroines, to wit, Gale Howard, Carol Carter, Janet Gordon, Phyllis Elton, Madge Reynolds, and Valerie Wallace. Rising seniors at Marchton High School, the girls arrive at the K Bar O Ranch in northern Arizona at the invitation of Gale's cousin, Virginia Wilson. Virginia's father owns the ranch, "one of the biggest in the state," with "large" cattle herds "of the finest stock." A weeks-long camping trip on horseback pits the girls, along with Virginia's older brother Tom and ranch hand Jim, against a band of rustlers that has driven Mr. Wilson close to the point of "ruin." Seen as a product of its time, K Bar O reflects a depression-era focus on domestic tourism. Americans "spent nearly half a billion dollars abroad" in 1932, and it was feared that "America was failing to exploit its touristic potential." Stimulus programs targeted "a variety of road-building programs and highway improvements," while "a series of promotions" such as the "See America" campaign was launched "to encourage travel within the United States." By the time K Bar O was published in 1936, domestic tourism had become "the second biggest industry" in the United States. Blank certainly understood how western tourism fit into the zeitgeist of 1930s America. Looking out at the desert, Carol declares "I'm overwhelmed! . . . From now on I shall be a strong advocate of See America First!"

Scenery combines with adventure in K Bar O, but usually takes a back seat. Chapter nine sees the girls tour the Colorado River and Grand Canyon, the Petrified Forest, the Painted Desert, Monument Valley (and "El Capitan" therein), and the ruins of the Betatakin cliff dwellings. Throughout the rest of the book, various assemblages of girls foil a bank robbery (chapter 1); get uncomfortably close to a rattlesnake (chapter 3); get lost in a cave with the (recently escaped) bandits (chapter 5); narrowly avoid being turned into "pancakes" by a boulder (chapter 7); get kidnapped (chapters 7–8); get shot at, and shoot a bandit, during escape from said kidnapping (chapter 8); rope and kill an attacking cougar (chapter 9); get kidnapped again (chapter 11); survive a ride on a runaway horse (chapter 16); get kidnapped for a third time after the bandits escape for a second time (chapter 17); and avoid another bullet (chapter 18). Tom is not quite as lucky, with chapter 19 seeing him get shot in the arm as he and the cook, Loo Wong, capture the bandits for the third and final time. For their efforts the Adventure Girls are awarded $1,000 by the sheriff. This is promptly bestowed upon Bobby, a destitute boy of "about eight," such that he can pursue a formal education. Adventures and good deeds concluded, the girls depart back East.

For their part, the six cattle rustlers are barely distinguishable. Three are originally introduced as bank robbers (one "short" and "dark haired," a second "tall," the third an unseen getaway driver), before later being shown to be rustlers also. Three other bandits are later introduced; of the five that are white, one is named "Mike" and another "Shorty," but all remain almost entirely interchangeable. It is never made clear whether "Mike" and "Shorty" are the "short" and "tall" bank robbers, two of the other three bandits, or some combination thereof. The only bandit who is clearly differentiated is the sixth, Pedro. Referred to by name 25 times, as "the Mexican" or "a Mexican" 36 times, and as a "half-breed" or "the breed" 3 times, he is presented in exceptionally stereotyped fashion. Vicious and with a "slurring accent" (e.g., "I weel fin' you and wit' my knife I weel slash"), a "long scar ran down his cheek, making his profile even more repulsive than it would ordinarily have been."

The only other minority character in the book is similarly stereotyped. Loo Wong, "a very fine Chinese cook" employed by the ranch, is as simple as Pedro is vicious. Instructed by Gale and Valerie on how to make fudge (despite being a cook, "when it came to candy he wasn't so artful"), he "bowed low" to the girls with "hands hidden in voluptuous sleeves" and "the grin of a delighted child on his face." More overtly, Loo Wong has a "yellow face" with "oriental pride," and a locution marked by the addition of unnecessary 'l's. "'Missy alle same fline cook,'" he proclaims before the fudge-making lesson. "'You teach Loo Wong?'" Although generally referred to by his proper name ("Loo Wong" 45 times, and "Wong" 6 times), in five instances he is instead "the Chinaman." As with the term "half-breed," in 1936 "Chinaman," while still seeing contemporary usage, was declining in popularity as it became more commonly thought of as a slur.

The Adventure Girls in the Air 

The Adventure Girls in the Air picks up with the six girls in their senior year at Marchton High School. The book involves two distinct narrative arcs. The first nine chapters involve the attempt by Brent Stockton, a pilot and inventor, to perfect a new airplane motor, and the attempts by enemies to steal his designs. Chapters ten through sixteen detail a plane crash resulting in Gale's disappearance, amnesia, and rediscovery. The book then concludes with five chapters narrating the end of the school year and preparations for college.

The novel opens on the beach, where the girls and three male companions—Bruce Latimer, David Kimball, and Peter Arnold—watch a "shining red monoplane" doing aerobatics above the Atlantic Ocean. After it crashes on nearby Cloudy Island (chapter 1), Gale, Phyllis and Bruce rush over, discovering a pilot with a sprained ankle and desire to remain for some weeks, anonymously, in a log cabin on the island. Brent Stockton, as it turns out, is a pilot and inventor of about "twenty-three" who is developing a "more or less foolproof" airplane motor that will be "the most practical and economical as well as fastest." An unknown competitor has attempted three times to steal Brent's plans, including "a bold attempt on [his] life." The following chapters involve more such attempts, leading to Bruce being punched (chapter 4) and the airplane hangar being subject to a bomb attempt (chapter 6) and an armed break-in by two men (chapter 7). These attempts prove fruitless. Brent's plane wins a race, setting him up to "sell his patent to the [United States] government" and accept a job in Washington, D.C. with the Transcontinental Air Line Company. His enemies, meanwhile, "after that one last attempt, seemed to fade into obscurity." Except for one glancing reference at the end of the ninth chapter ("The plane had come through and defeated all Brent's enemies"), they are inexplicably never mentioned again.

The disappearance of Brent's enemies, and their complete lack of mention thereafter, brings about a dramatic plot shift. Brent flies Gale and her father, a "successful" lawyer, to visit a client in Quebec. Gale and Brent return the next day while Mr. Howard stays behind for another night. Despite being "one of the best pilots there is," Brent forgets to fill up on gas before leaving Quebec and crashes in the woods (chapter 10). He leaves to get help for a trapped and unconscious Gale, who, it develops, now suffers from amnesia. She is discovered and taken in by François and Antoinette Bouchard, French Canadian siblings living in a small "farmhouse" in the woods. While Gale's friends search frantically for her, the Bouchards are unable to alert the world to her presence. As François explains it, "I injured my foot [splitting logs], and I have not been able to go to the village to notify the authorities. My sister knows very little about such things." This does not prevent Antoinette from taking Gale into the village; rather, she simply avoids telling anyone about Gale's background, and apparently nobody thinks to ask who the stranger is. Gale is eventually discovered (chapter 13), but this still leaves time for her to spend a night lost in the woods (chapter 15) and have her memory restored by a fall off a 20-foot cliff (chapter 16). Once back in Marchton, Gale accepts Brent's proposal at Senior Prom (chapter 19), and the girls trick Phyllis's "positive tyrant" of an aunt into allowing Phyllis to attend college at Briarhurst with the other five (chapter 20). The next and final chapter sees Gale and Bruce trapped on Cloudy Island during a storm, and the book ends on an anticlimactic note as they await rescuers from the mainland.

The Adventure Girls in the Air was written extremely quickly, possibly in less than three weeks. A January 17, 1936 letter from A. L. Burt acknowledges receipt of the manuscript for The Adventure Girls at K Bar O, and asks "how soon could we have two additional stories . . . ?" 25 days later, on February 11, another letter declared The Adventure Girls in the Air "an absolutely interesting story, and especially delightful [is] the description of life in the Canadian woods." This breakneck pace perhaps explains some of the plot holes and oversights in the story. The book features a series of narrative arcs, which are concluded and forgotten in succession; Brent's enemies disappear halfway through the book, and, after Gale's amnestic saga, the book turns to the more mundane aspects of high school life. Lines are repeated, and sometimes contradict each other. "The wheels were sticking grotesquely up into the air" is used twice, verbatim, to describe the plane crash in the first chapter and that in the tenth; incidentally, this line is itself taken almost verbatim from Blank's 1934 work Beverly Gray, Senior, where a car crash leaves "the four wheels sticking grotesquely up into the air." A contradiction arises when Gale attests to Brent's prodigious aviation skills in the eighth chapter, asking "[d]idn't he fly that anti-toxin up to Alaska to those Eskimos last year and save hundreds of lives?" Three chapters later, Peter suggests the pilot was someone else: "Airplanes have saved hundreds of lives. Look at the time that aviator flew that serum to those Eskimos up north." Meanwhile, Gale spends much of chapter 18, "Studies," attempting to learn poetry, which previously "awoke no interest in her whatever." Yet despite the fact that before this point "[s]he had not liked any of the poets," when talking about love with Brent in chapter six she quotes the poem How Do I Love Thee?. "'[D]id you ever read Elizabeth Browning?'" Gale asks Brent. "'She says—"I love thee with the breath, smiles, tears, of all my life!" I always thought—maybe—I should love someone like that some day.'" Blank's trilogy was slated "for early spring publication," and it was written on a tight schedule. After The Adventure Girls in the Air was reviewed on February 11, A. L. Burt asked for the third volume to be ready "a little sooner" than the first week of March. The trilogy was evidently ready by the end of April; it seems that editing, by both author and publisher, was de-emphasized to make this happen.

The Adventure Girls at Happiness House 
The Adventure Girls at Happiness House is the third and final published work in this series. The book finds the six girls at Briarhurst College, where they have just arrived to begin their first year. The college has an unpopular new dean, and the main plot revolves around the efforts of an unknown individual to hurt or possibly kill her. A subplot center on Phyllis, who breaks her leg and needs an operation to be able to walk again, and on her unknown father, who is discovered to be a famous surgeon. The book's title refers to the name of the Omega Chi sorority house where Gale and Phyllis live.

After arriving at Briarhurst College, the girls soon learn that newly instated Dean Travis is an unpopular force on campus. Opposition to her plans, which include "new laboratories for the Chemistry classes, a new organ for the chapel, stables and horses to teach the girls riding and a few other such things," seems to be highest among the girls who enjoyed "special privileges" under the old dean, but at least one person is particularly violent. Gale's introduction to the new dean comes when she saves her canoe, rope cut and set adrift, from going over a waterfall (chapter 2). Suspicious events continue. Chapter 4 alone sees the dean sent poisoned candy, have her curtains set on fire, and, with Gale, narrowly avoid a vial of acid tossed from a window. Two chapters later, college funds are reported stolen from the safe and a typewritten note warning the girls "Do not interfere in affairs that are none of your concern" is slipped under Gale's door.

A number of characters are initially suggested as suspicious. "I heard that one of the Chemistry teachers is sending the Dean candy and flowers," says Janet, and Phyllis tries to draw a link between a professor and the poisoned candy: "Chemistry Professor, acid, poisoned candy—they all fit together." Gale exerts her efforts by turning "all the girls into Sherlock Holmeses" to find the typewriter used to create the warning note. Coming back to her room one day, she discovers her room to have been ransacked. "Someone was hunting for that note, I’ll wager," she opines. The mystery deepens when Gale tests the dean's own typewriter and finds it to produce type identical to that on the warning note. Meanwhile, while walking on campus at night she is surprised by a "man's figure" with "hat pulled low ... and a long overcoat with collar turned up completely." Seeing Gale, the man flees.

As the mystery continues, Phyllis breaks her leg during the Freshman-Junior field hockey game and spends weeks convalescing in the college infirmary. Her healing is interrupted and her leg "crushed" some five weeks later when she saves Gale and the dean from a pile of falling lumber. (Although this incident is initially described as suspicious, Gale later declares that "I believe that really was an accident.") At first this is cast as a minor setback. "I am afraid your friend is right where she was five weeks ago," the doctor tells Gale. Phyllis's leg was "[n]ot too badly crushed but enough to undo the healing of these past weeks." Yet this prognosis is suddenly and inexplicably reversed in the very next chapter, entitled "Bad News." The doctor's new diagnosis is that Phyllis "will never walk again," at least "not as other girls," without an operation by "the best [surgeon] in the East." Gale accepts this news at face value and seeks funds from Phyllis's aunt to pay for the operation. Described most kindly as "aloof" and "stern," and most damningly as "a female Simon Legree," she initially refuses to help without explanation. Christmas break brings more opportunities for Gale's overtures, however, and eventually Mrs. Fields divulges that she is not truly Phyllis's aunt. Her tale is, fittingly, "a story as incredible and fantastic as any fiction":

So begins the effort to find Phyllis's father, revealed to be the celebrated surgeon Doctor Philip Elton. Brent Stockton, Gale's fiancé, resolves to lead this search, for, famous as the surgeon is, his location remains unknown.

Before the search for Doctor Elton can get far, Dean Travis's enemy is unmasked by Gale. Visiting the chemistry department "to see Professor Lukens about our Chemistry assignment," she observes the dean's secretary, Miss Horton, taking a vial from a locked cabinet. Gale follows her back to the dean's office and catches her mixing the substance into a glass of water and telling someone over the phone that "Sarah—you will be Dean of Briarhurst someday." Confronted, the secretary confesses. "Yes, I meant to poison [the dean]," she says. "'If it hadn't been for her my sister would be Dean of Briarhurst. She worked years to have the position, she studied in Europe, everything to fit herself for this. Then [Dean Travis] came along . . . and [was] appointed. It nearly broke my sister's heart.'" She then adds as an aside that she was also the one who stole money from the safe. "I meant to put it back," she says, "but I couldn't right away. Now you will probably send me to prison." The dean, despite nearly having been murdered, is forgiving. She "smiled in sympathetic understanding. 'No, but if you return the money, pack your things and leave tonight, we will forget the whole incident.'" The mystery is thus solved, and indeed forgotten. Left unresolved is both the question of whether (and if so, why) Miss Horton really was earlier poisoned by candy intended for the dean, and also the identity of the mysterious man in "a long overcoat." As to the latter, "we will probably never know," Gale declares. Miss Horton "must have had someone with her."

With the discovery of Miss Horton acting in flagrante, the plot turns once again to Phyllis, her need for an operation, and the search for her father. His location is partly determined as soon as the girls leave Dean Travis's office for their sorority house. Passing a radio, they happen to hear a relevant bulletin: "Flash! An unconfirmed report has just been received that Doctor Philip Elton, the world renowned surgeon, is lost in the jungles of Brazil. Doctor Elton sailed from Liverpool, England, a month ago for a vacation cruise on his yacht, the Tornado." Brent calls to say that he and David Kimball, a friend from Marchton, are flying to Brazil to join "a searching party" sent by the "South American government" (whatever that is). A few pages later Gale receives "a thick letter from Brent" declaring the doctor found. As with Miss Horton and her mysterious accomplice, Doctor Elton's Brazilian adventure quickly passes from all mention with no details ever related of his time lost in the wilderness.

Doctor Elton is flown to Briarhurst once he is found. The necessary operation is performed, Phyllis is informed of the "fantastic fairy story" of her upbringing, and familial harmony is restored. The final chapters relate the more day to day aspects of life at Briarhurst College. Janet is thrown from a horse (chapter 16), Gale pretends to drown to coax Phyllis from her wheelchair (chapter 17), and Phyllis rescues horses from a burning stable, collapses, and is rescued in turn by Gale (chapter 19). The final chapter sees the girls after their final classes discussing summer plans, for which Doctor Elton has offered the use of his yacht. No fourth book was ever published, but The Adventure Girls at Happiness House closes with a promise for more adventure:

Characters

* No speaking lines in book

† Mentioned in book, but does not appear or speak

Publication History
By January 17 of 1936, Blank had submitted her manuscript for The Adventure Girls at K Bar O to A. L. Burt Company, her publisher for Beverly Gray series. Responding with enthusiasm to the work, her publisher "thought a series of this nature would be a good one to add to our list," and asked "how soon could we have two additional stories to add to the present one." The succeeding novels were written extremely quickly. A February 11 letter called The Adventure Girls in the Air "an absorbingly interesting story," while on March 16 The Adventure Girls at Happiness House was deemed "a very suitable narrative for girls. Although the action slows down at times, it maintains interest and has sufficient number of exciting events to make it interesting as well as mysterious. Blank was paid a flat fee of $150 per manuscript, earning no royalties. The books were copyrighted the next month, and targeted "for early spring publication."

Although the Beverly Gray series would see a book issued in 1937 by A. L. Burt, The Adventure Girls was never continued. In March 1937 A. L. Burt was sold to Blue Ribbon Books, and on June 2, 1938, Blue Ribbon Books wrote Blank to inform her that "[w]e have just concluded negotiations to sell our entire juvenile business to the firm of Grosset & Dunlap." Somewhere along the way The Adventure Girls was dropped; its rights never made it to Grosset & Dunlap, but were instead sold to Saalfield, a small Ohio-based reprint specialist without the means to commission new works. Saalfield left the series idle, perhaps not even reprinting the existing three titles until the fall of 1942. Blank wrote the company in March of that year, stating "[i]t has been several years since you took over the girls' juvenile series 'The Adventure Girls' when the A. L. Burt Company, of New York, disbanded, and during that time the series has been left idle. It is my desire to know whether or not you intend to do anything with the series in the future or if they are for sale to any other publisher." Saalfield responded with plans to publish the three titles "this fall," but declined Blank's request of a fourth volume: "We are not in the market for new material at this time, but should we desire to bring out any additional titles in this series we shall be happy to get in touch with you." Saalfield never did "desire to bring out any additional titles"; though the three original works were reprinted over the years, The Adventure Girls never saw any additional titles published.

Formats
The Adventure Girls books were published by both A. L. Burt and by Saalfield, and accordingly were issued in multiple formats. Under A. L. Burt, the books were thick green hardcovers, approximately eight inches in height; the black and white glossy frontispieces copied the illustrations on the dust jackets. When republished by Saalfield, the books initially kept the same height, but were issued with boards of colors, such as blue, green, or red, and with poor quality paper. The frontispieces, no longer glossy, were given line drawn renderings of the dust jacket illustrations. At some point the books were printed approximately an inch shorter, while Saalfield occasionally issued the books in cardboard box sets.

Notes

References

American novel series
American children's novels
American young adult novels
Children's mystery novels
Juvenile series
Series of children's books
Young adult novel series
1936 children's books